Oxyrhopus emberti is a species of snake in the family Colubridae.  The species is native to Bolivia.

References

Oxyrhopus
Snakes of South America
Reptiles of Bolivia
Endemic fauna of Bolivia
Reptiles described in 2020